"Allen" is the second episode of the first season of the television series Prison Break, which was first broadcast on television on August 29, 2005. The episode is the second to air alongside the Pilot episode as part of the two-part start of the series. "Allen" was written by series creator Paul Scheuring and directed by Michael Watkins. Robert Knepper makes his first appearance as Theodore "T-Bag" Bagwell, but was not yet billed as a regular character until the following episode, "Cell Test". Also, Marshall Allman, despite credited, does not appear as L. J. Burrows.

The episode's title refers to the hex key that Michael makes from a screw, the key being named "Allen Schweitzer 11121147". Also in this episode, Veronica Donovan continues her investigation as to who is actually responsible to framing Lincoln Burrows on Michael's request, while at the same time, Michael deals with the impending race riot in Fox River, which could hinder his escape plans.

Plot
Michael Scofield and Fernando Sucre (Amaury Nolasco) face a lockdown in order for the guards to search cells for contraband, when they're about to throw away a knife, they were stopped by Bellick (Wade Williams), who sends Sucre to SHU. Warden Pope (Stacy Keach) calls off the search for Michael's cell, but Bellick feels determined to, and sneaks into his cell when the prisoners are away, and finds the name "Allen Schweitzer". Bellick runs the name on the database, only to find no one matching it.

Meanwhile, Sucre urges Stolte to let him call Maricruz (Camille Guaty), but is refused. Veronica (Robin Tunney) investigates who is framing Lincoln Burrows. She finds a tape, where she sees Lincoln shoot Terrence Steadman dead. Lincoln claims that he is being framed, stating the man was already dead and Lincoln never pulled the trigger. She attempts to talk to Crab Simmons (Tab Baker), who didn't testify in his case, only to find out that he was killed of an apparent drug overdose. She is contacted by Leticia Barris (Adina Porter), Crab's girlfriend, but as they meet, she is spooked as Kellerman (Paul Adelstein) and Hale (Danny McCarthy) are watching.

Back in Fox River, Michael attempts to get to a bolt from a bleacher belonging to T-Bag (Robert Knepper), but is stopped. He doesn't want Scofield on the bleacher unless he will join in the racist battle between the whites and blacks, but he declines. On his second attempt, T-Bag's gang take the bolt off him, so eventually, he decides to join in to get at the bolt. However, C-Note (Rockmond Dunbar) sees this, and when he confronts Scofield regarding the PUGNAc, he refuses to give the pills. Soon, everyone comes out of their cell for count, when the riot starts. Michael decides to get the bolt back from T-Bag's cellmate (Brian Hamman), and does so after a struggle. C-Note sees this and a black inmate stabs the cellmate several times; the wounded man dies in Michael's arms. T-Bag believes Michael killed the cellmate, and plans to get back at him. The fight stops through lockdown. Michael rubs the bolt until the end forms a hexagon shape key, big enough to unscrew the cell's toilet. It is explained that "Allen" is the screw, and "Schweitzer" is the lavatory.

After the lockdown is finished, C-Note decides to give him the PUGNAc due to his take in the riot, and tells him he will eventually find out what he's up to. Michael takes it, where Dr. Tancredi (Sarah Wayne Callies) gives him the test and finds out he is diabetic. Afterwards, Bellick takes Michael to an area, where Abruzzi (Peter Stormare) attempts to extract information regarding Fibonacci's whereabouts, but refuses to answer. Abruzzi has his men cut off two of Michael's toes to try to get him to talk.

Production

Casting
Rockmond Dunbar, Robert Knepper and Paul Adelstein, who play C-Note, T-Bag and Paul Kellerman respectively made appearances in the episode, but are not yet billed as regulars until the next episode, except for C-Note, who'll be billed as a series regular from "The Rat". Marshall Allman, who plays L. J. Burrows does not appear in this episode. Anthony Starke, who plays Sebastian Balfour, Veronica Donovan's fiance was credited, but didn't make an appearance either. Making her first appearance is Patricia Wettig, who was credited as "Garlic cutter". Another first appearance includes Kurt Caceres, who plays Hector Avila, Fernando Sucre's cousin. Gunner McGrath, singer of the Chicago punk rock band Much the Same appears as an extra in this episode. He is seen wearing a black bandana on his head just prior to the outbreak of the riot.

Music

Reception
Alongside the Pilot, "Allen" was given viewing figures of 10.5 million, with a rating of 4.6 among the 18-46 age group, making it the seventh most watched show in that week. After its UK release, the episode received figures of under 1 million viewers, and didn't register as the top 30 most watched programming for the week it aired, according to BARB.

References

External links

Prison Break episodes
2005 American television episodes